Philip Bester and Chris Guccione were the defending champions, but Guccione decided not to participate this year. Bester partnered with Peter Polansky, but lost in the quarterfinals to Daniel Evans and Lloyd Glasspool.

James Cerretani and Max Schnur won the title, defeating Evans and Glasspool 3–6, 6–3, [11–9] in the final.

Seeds

Draw

Draw

References
Main Draw

Challenger Banque Nationale de Drummondville
Challenger de Drummondville